Niroshan Premaratne  is a Sri Lankan politician and a member of the Parliament of Sri Lanka. He was elected from Matara District in 2015. He is a Member of the United People's Freedom Alliance.

References

Living people
Members of the 15th Parliament of Sri Lanka
Year of birth missing (living people)